John Du Prez (born Trevor Jones; 14 December 1946) is a British musician, conductor and composer. He was a member of the 1980s salsa-driven pop band Modern Romance and has since written several film scores including Oxford Blues (1984), Once Bitten, Teenage Mutant Ninja Turtles (1990), and the final Carry On film,  Carry On Columbus (1992). He contributed to The Wild (2006) soundtrack. 

He is also known for his extensive collaborations with Monty Python,  having worked on several films and shows by members of the troupe, including composing, conducting, and arranging for Monty Python’s Life of Brian (1979), Time Bandits, Monty Python Live at the Hollywood Bowl (both 1982),  Monty Python's The Meaning of Life (1983), A Private Function (1984), A Fish Called Wanda (1988), The Wind in the Willows (1996), Spamalot (2004), Not the Messiah (He's a Very Naughty Boy) (2010), and Monty Python Live (Mostly) (2014). For his work on Spamalot, which ran 1,575 performances on Broadway, he was nominated for the Tony Award for Best Original Score.

Early life and education
Du Prez was born in Sheffield, England. He received his MA (Oxon), B.Mus., ARCM, and was a Trevelyan Scholar at Christ Church, Oxford. In 1976 he joined the staff of the London University's Music Department before becoming a full-time composer. He would then begin a 30-year working relationship with Eric Idle.

Career
Du Prez has often worked with Eric Idle for the music for Monty Python, most notably the score for Monty Python's The Meaning of Life as well as with John Cleese on A Fish Called Wanda. He acted as music arranger on the Terry Jones film Monty Python's Life of Brian (1979) and on the Terry Gilliam film Time Bandits (1981), and he also co-wrote the music for the stage musical Spamalot, as well as the music and the intro theme of the British series Captain Star. In 1986, Du Prez contributed songs to the soundtrack of the Madonna and Sean Penn movie Shanghai Surprise: "The Hottest Gong In Town" and "Zig-Zag" (both sung by the film's executive producer George Harrison).Lee-Williams, Matt: Du Rez, John, Biography, Internet Movie Database, Filmography, [accessed] 25 April 2011.

The adoption of the name John Du Prez was to avoid confusion with the South African film composer Trevor Jones. He is probably best known as the trumpet and horn player in the 1980s Pop group Modern Romance, who had a string of Top 40 hits from 1981–83, and made many guest appearances on TV shows such as the BBC programme Top of the Pops.

John Du Prez has also scored various films including the Rob Lowe vehicle Oxford Blues (1984), the Comedy film A Private Function (1984), the Jim Carrey horror comedy Once Bitten (1985), and the Teenage Mutant Ninja Turtles movies; his piece of music - or Suite - Shredder's Suite is taken from the soundtrack to the first of the three films, Teenage Mutant Ninja Turtles (1990). He recently contributed to the soundtrack of the animated film The Wild (2006).

Modern Romance (1981–83)
Du Prez joined Modern Romance (band) during the early 1980s and remained with them throughout their most successful years. He appeared on their debut album Adventures in Clubland (1981) and on two further albums: Trick of the Light (1983) and Party Tonight (1983). He is probably best remembered as playing the trumpet solo on the Modern Romance cover version of Cherry Pink (and Apple Blossom White) which made the UK top twenty in 1982. The B-side to Cherry Pink ... is dedicated to Du Prez, a (nearly) instrumental track titled Who Is John Du Prez?. Modern Romance scored seven further Top Forty hits before disbanding in 1985, including Best Years of Our Lives (Songs) which reached #4 on the UK chart and later featured in the movie Shrek. The other members of Modern Romance included Geoff Deane (Lead Vocalist), Paul Gendler (guitarist), David Jaymes (Bass player, Vocals and Founder Member), Robbie Jaymes (Keyboard player), Andy Kriacou (Drummer), and Michael J. Mullins (Lead Vocalist).Modern Romance, Where Are They Now, BBC Top of the Pops 2, Artists, [accessed] 24 April 2011.

Modern Romance toured extensively throughout the early 1980s - including the UK, Europe, the Far East, and Venezuela - and were awarded several Gold Discs for their efforts. Their album, Adventures in Clubland, hit the #1 spot - and went Gold - in South America, and produced three UK hits (Everybody Salsa #12, Ay Ay Ay Ay Moosey #10, and Queen of the Rapping Scene / Nothing Ever Goes the Way You Plan #37); the single Can You Move also peaked at #2 on the US Dance chart. Following a change in lead vocalist - from Geoff Deane to Michael J. Mullins - Modern Romance enjoyed what would be their watershed year, 1983. They made a significant dent in the UK charts with the following singles: Best Years of Our Lives #4, High Life #8, Don't Stop That Crazy Rhythm #14, Walking in the Rain #7, and Good Friday #96. Two albums - a studio album and a Christmas compilation - also made the UK album charts that year: Trick of the Light (album) #53 and Party Tonight #45. Du Prez's trumpets and horns featured on nearly every track, from the party songs Best Years of Our Lives and High Life to the salsa tunes Everybody Salsa and Ay Ay Ay Ay Moosey to the band's bluesy and soulful ballads like Walking in the Rain, the latter UK top ten hit also reaching #1 in Thailand. He also played on the band's cover version of Band of Gold (Freda Payne song) (1983). Du Prez left Modern Romance before they called it quits in 1985, but his trumpets sounds could be heard on their farewell single, Best Mix of Our Lives (1985), their last chart entry (#81).Lee-Williams, Matt: Jaymes, David, Internet Movie Database Biography, [accessed] 25 April 2011.

Du Prez can be found - with the other band members - on the cover of the Trick of the Light (album), which was featured in the Taschen Book 1000 Record Covers. The book presents a selection of the best vinyl cover art from the 1960s to the 1990s, and from a cross section of music genres. From a recording and production standpoint, the bulk of Modern Romance's music was produced by Tony Visconti; they were signed by the record labels WEA and Ronco. Du Prez and Modern Romance performed their hit single, High Life, on the Russell Harty Television Show in 1983, with Cleo Rocos as backing vocalist.

In 2006 Du Prez featured on the Warner CD Modern Romance: The Platinum Collection, a compilation featuring the best of Modern Romance.

Selected filmography (composer)

Monty Python's The Meaning of Life (1983)
A long time friend of Eric Idle, Du Prez composed the score for Monty Python's The Meaning of Life in 1983, while still a member of Modern Romance (band). The film stars John Cleese, Terry Gilliam, Graham Chapman, Idle, and Michael Palin. It is directed by - and also features - Terry Jones. Du Prez also contributed as composer.Lee-Williams, Matt: Du Prez, John, Biography, Internet Movie Database, Filmography, [accessed] 25 April 2011.

Oxford Blues (1984)
Du Prez composed the score for this 1980s remake of A Yank at Oxford (1938). Oxford Blues (1984) was an early project for Rob Lowe, a teen drama which also featured Cary Elwes, Michael Gough, Chad Lowe, Amanda Pays, Julian Sands and Ally Sheedy.

A Private Function (1984)A Private Function (1984) marks another team-up with Michael Palin. This comedy (film) - the score composed by Du Prez - also stars Alan Bennett, Denholm Elliott, Pete Postlethwaite and Maggie Smith. Du Prez also contributes as conductor.

Once Bitten (1985)
The film was an early vehicle for Jim Carrey, Karen Kopins and Lauren Hutton. Once Bitten (1985) is a mixture of the horror film and the comedy. It also features Cleavon Little. Du Prez is score composer.

A Fish Called Wanda (1988)
Featuring some of the Monty Python cast, A Fish Called Wanda (1988) included John Cleese, Jamie Lee Curtis, Kevin Kline and Michael Palin. This is a British comedy (film) for which Du Prez wrote the score.A Fish Called Wanda, Cast and Crew, Internet Movie Database, Filmography, [accessed] 25 April 2011.

Teenage Mutant Ninja Turtles 1 – 3 (1990–93)Teenage Mutant Ninja Turtles (1990) is an action, adventure and comedy - based on the Teenage Mutant Ninja Turtles comic book. Du Prez composed the score for the movie, whilst Corey Feldman, Judith Hoag, Elias Koteas, David Warner and other actors provided the voices or played live-action roles. Du Prez also provided the score for the sequels, Teenage Mutant Ninja Turtles II: The Secret of the Ooze and Teenage Mutant Ninja Turtles III, and his song - That's Your Consciousness - can be found on the second film's soundtrack.Teenage Mutant Ninja Turtles, Cast and Crew, Internet Movie Database, Filmography, [accessed] 25 April 2011.

 Carry On Columbus (1992) Carry On Columbus (1992) is a landmark in film, in that it is the final chapter in the Carry On films. Du Prez composed the score for this comedy which stars Julian Clary, Bernard Cribbins, Jim Dale, Maureen Lipman, Rik Mayall, Leslie Phillips, Nigel Planer, Alexei Sayle, and June Whitfield.Carry On Columbus, Cast and Crew, Internet Movie Database, Filmography, [accessed] 25 April 2011.

Fascination (2004)Fascination (2004) is an American mystery thriller starring Jacqueline Bisset, Adam Garcia, and James Naughton. Du Prez composed the score for the film and would work once more with Modern Romance member, David Jaymes, who acted as music supervisor, having since ventured into the management side of the business.Jaymes, David, Filmography, Internet Movie Database, Filmography, [accessed] 25 April 2011.

Discography

Albums (with Modern Romance)Adventures in Clubland (album) (1982) Venezuela #1 [Gold]Trick of the Light (1983) UK #53Party Tonight (1983) UK #45Juanita aka Party Tonight (1983) Japan

Singles (with Modern Romance)Everybody Salsa (1981) UK #10Ay Ay Ay Ay Moosey (1981) UK #12Queen of the Rapping Scene / Nothing Ever Goes the Way You Plan (1982) UK #37Cherry Pink and Apple Blossom White (1982) UK #15Best Years of Our Lives (1983) UK #4High Life (1983) UK #8Don't Stop That Crazy Rhythm (1983) UK #14Walking in the Rain (1983) UK #7 & Thailand #1Good Friday (1983) UK #96Best Mix of Our Lives (1985) UK #81

Singles (as solo artist)Oh My Papa (1983)

Composer (scores)
 Nursery Rhymes (1979)
 The Pantomime Dame [documentary] (1982)
 The Meaning of Life (1983)
 The Crimson Permanent Assurance [short] (1983)
 Bullshot (1983)
 Oxford Blues (1984)
 A Private Function (1984)
 She'll Be Wearing Pink Pyjamas (1985)
 Once Bitten (1985)
 Love with the Perfect Stranger [TV Movie] (1986)
 Personal Services (1987)
 Sunday Premiere TV Series, episode "Claws" (1987)
 Number 27 (1988)
 A Fish Called Wanda (1988)
 A Chorus of Disapproval (1989)
 UHF (1989)
 Teenage Mutant Ninja Turtles (1990)
 Screen Two TV Series [3 episodes] (1988-1990)
 Bullseye! (1990)
 Teenage Mutant Ninja Turtles II: The Secret of the Ooze (1991)
 Mystery Date (1991)
 Thacker (1991)
 Carry On Columbus (1992)
 Teenage Mutant Ninja Turtles III (1993)
 A Good Man in Africa (1994)
 The Wind in the Willows (1996)
 Captain Star TV Series [4 episodes] (1997)
 Dog and Duck (2000)
 Fascination (2004)
 The Large Family TV Series (2006)
 Not the Messiah (He's a Very Naughty Boy) (2010)
 Clangers (2015–present)

Writer (soundtracks)Monty Python: Almost the Truth - The Lawyers Cut TV Series - Fuck Christmas & The Galaxy Song (2009)BCN aixeca el telo TV Series - The Song That Goes Like This (2008)The Wild - Really Nice Day & Really Nice Day Finale (2006)Splitting Heirs - Somebody Stole My Baby (1993)Teenage Mutant Ninja Turtles II: The Secret of the Ooze - That's Your Consciousness (1991)Shanghai Surprise - Hottest Gong in Town & Zig-Zag (1986)The Crimson Permanent Assurance - Short Film - Accountancy Shanty (1983)Monty Python's The Meaning of Life - The Meaning of Life, Oh Lord Please Don't Burn Us, Galaxy Song & Accountancy Shanty (1983)Time Bandits - Me and My Shadow (arrangement) (1981)Monty Python's Life of Brian - Brian Song (1979)

ConductorMonty Python Live at the Hollywood Bowl (1982)A Private Function (1984)A Fish Called Wanda (1988)A Good Man in Africa (film) (1994)Not the Messiah (He's a Very Naughty Boy) (2010)Monty Python Live (Mostly) (2014)

Music producerA Good Man in Africa (film) (1994)Not the Messiah (He's a Very Naughty Boy) (2010)

Music arrangerOne Foot in the Grave TV Series [41 episodes] + Signature Tune (1990–2000)Captain Star TV Series [4 episodes] (1997)

ActorBullshot (film) (1983) as Ginger JohnsonOne Foot in the Grave TV Series, episode The Beast in the Cage (1992) as The voice of (voice)

ScreenwriterNot the Messiah (He's a Very Naughty Boy) with Eric Idle (2010)

SelfNot the Messiah (He's a Very Naughty Boy) (as the conductor) (2010)Monty Python: Almost the Truth - The Lawyers Cut [3 episodes] TV Series (2009)The South Bank Show TV series documentary [1 episode] (2006)The 59th Annual Tony Awards TV Special (2005)Rod and Emu's Saturday Special [1 episode] with Modern Romance (band) (1983)Good Friday with Modern Romance (band) Music Video (1983)Walking in the Rain with Modern Romance (band) Music Video (1983)Don't Stop That Crazy Rhythm with Modern Romance (band) Music Video (1983)High Life with Modern Romance (band) Music Video (1983)The Russell Harty Television Show with Modern Romance (band) [unknown episodes] (1983)The Krankies Club TV Series [3 episodes] with Modern Romance (band) (1982–83)Top of the Pops with Modern Romance (band) [unknown episodes] (1982–83)Best Years of Our Lives with Modern Romance (band) Music Video (1982)Get It Together TV Series [episodes unknown] (1982)The Keith Harris (ventriloquist) Show'' TV Series [1 episode] with Modern Romance (band) (1982)

Awards and accolades
48th Grammy Awards - Grammy Award for Best Musical Show Album - Winner with Eric Idle - Monty Python's Spamalot  (2005).
59th Tony Award's - Best Original Score (Music and/or Lyrics) Written for the Theatre (John Du Prez and Eric Idle (Music); Eric Idle (Lyrics)) Nominee - Monty Python's Spamalot (2005).

References 

1946 births
Living people
Associates of the Royal College of Music
English composers
Musicians from Sheffield
Grammy Award winners